Pamphagus sardeus is a large species of Pamphagidae and one of the most massive Italian Orthoptera.

Distribution and habitat
This species can be encountered exclusively in Sardinia, and is more frequently found in spring and summer in the southern part of the island, where it lives in dry natural grassland.

Description
The overall shape is typical of Pamphagidae and very similar to Pamphagus marmoratus, to the point that for a long time this species was reported as P. marmoratus before the works by Harz (1969 and 1975) definitively separated it on the basis of the longer cerci, a different profile of the ultimate tergite and the shape of male genitalia.

Biology
Pamphagus sardeus, like the other Pamphagidae, is herbivore.
Adults, especially females, rarely jump, look quite torpid and clumsy and can be easily captured with the hands.
Although relatively widespread, it's not easy to meet and it never occurs in large numbers.

A lab audio recording attributed to P. sardeus is available on the Orthoptera Species File website.

Gallery

References

External links

 Panfago Sardo su Sardegna Natura
 Video of a specimen of Pamphagus sardeus

Insects described in 1840

Pamphagidae
Orthoptera of Europe
Taxa named by Gottlieb August Wilhelm Herrich-Schäffer